Clovis Swinney (August 17, 1945 – July 3, 2019) was an American football defensive tackle. He played for the New Orleans Saints in 1970 and for the New York Jets in 1971.

References

1945 births
American football defensive tackles
Arkansas Razorbacks football players
Arkansas State Red Wolves football players
New Orleans Saints players
New York Jets players
2019 deaths